Professor Hassan Ugail is a mathematician and a computer scientist. He is currently working as a professor of Visual Computing at the School of Engineering and Informatics at the University of Bradford. Professor Ugail is the first Maldivian to obtain a PhD in mathematics. He is also the first and to date the only Maldivian to receive a professorship in the field of Science.

Professor Ugail is well known for his work on computer-based human face analysis including, face recognition, face ageing, emotion analysis and lie detection. For example, in 2018, he has used his face recognition tools to help unmask the two suspected Russian spies at the heart of the Salisbury Novichok poisoning case. And, in 2020, Professor Ugail collaborated with the BBC News investigators to uncover an alleged Nazi war criminal, who settled in the UK, who could have worked for the British intelligence during the Cold War.

Prof. Ugail's principal research interests are in the area of Visual Computing, particularly in the area of 3D geometric design, 3D imaging, computer-based simulations and machine learning. Prof. Ugail is a leader in the field of Visual Computing and has greatly contributed to the development of the field by successfully delivering a number of high-profile research and innovation projects, publications and international lectures. He is a member of the UK Engineering and Physical Sciences Research Council (EPSRC) peer review college and also a peer reviewer for several related journals and conferences in his field of research.

Early life 
Hassan Ugail was born in Hithadhoo, Maldives. He completed his primary education at Nooranee School in Hithadhoo. In the 1960s, Hassan Ugail's father, Ahmed Ugail, worked as a clerk at the British Royal Air Force base in Gan Island in the Maldives. Hassan Ugail claims that though his beginning was humble, he was academically much privileged from a young age because his father could speak English and had access to books of varied nature that his father was able to obtain from the British based in Gan Island. 
In 1987, he moved to Malé to continue his education at the English Preparatory And Secondary School and at the Centre for Higher Secondary Education. Hassan Ugail was a top student and considered to be bright. In 1992, he received the opportunity to continue his studies in the UK as a result of a British Council scholarship.

Academic life 
Ugail received a B.Sc. degree with First Class Honours in Mathematics in 1995 and a PGCE in 1996 both from King's College London. He was awarded his PhD by the Department of Applied Mathematics at University of Leeds in the year 2000 for his research in geometric design. He then worked as a post-doctoral research fellow at the Department of Applied Mathematics at University of Leeds until September 2002. Prof. Ugail joined the School of Informatics, University of Bradford, as a lecturer in September 2002. He was appointed as a Senior Lecturer in April 2005. Ugail became a professor in 2009 at the age of 38 and is among the youngest professors at the University of Bradford.  He currently serves as the director of the Centre for Visual Computing at the University of Bradford.

Research 
Professor Ugail's principal research interests are in the areas of geometric design, computer-based physical analysis, and machine learning that all fall into a broad area of research known as Simulation-Based Design and Machine Learning. The focus of his research has been particularly upon a novel method for geometric design known as the PDE (partial differential equation) method developed at the University of Leeds. The PDE method is based on a suitably chosen PDE that enables to model complex shapes in an easy and predictable fashion. Prof. Ugail also developed the method of biharmonic Bézier surface for boundary based smooth surface design with Professor Monterde from University of Valencia, Spain. His work on computer-based human face analysis based on artificial intelligence and machine learning has introduced numerous novel methods which are being practically utilized in the area of biometrics as well for applications in healthcare.

His research has many practical applications, which include building new application environments for complex interactive computer-aided design and computer animation, design analysis and optimisation for engineering and biomedical applications such as accurate computer modelling of shapes of biological membranes, the human heart and artificial limbs. Other than that, his research using artificial intelligence and machine learning is applicable to biometric identification such as face recognition, non-invasive human emotion analysis, lie detection as well as medical image understanding for diagnostic purposes.

Achievements 
His methods for the representation of a three-dimensional object and for the storage and transmission of data representing a three-dimensional object; and his method for the time-dependent animation of a three-dimensional object  are all protected under British and US patent laws, between 2008 and 2015.

His research in Visual Computing techniques has led to the establishment of a university spin-out company Tangentix Ltd that looked at defining and manipulating complex digital data applied to develop computer games. Tangentix subsequently launched GameSessions that enable users to try or buy PC games online with ease. Professor Ugail was the founder and CSO of Tangentix Ltd. It was a UK-based startup exploring the use of 3D graphics compression. The company raised both Series A and Series B funding, in 2013 and 2015 respectively, and was aquaired by Toadman Interactive in 2019.

In 2010 Professor Ugail won the most prestigious award from University of Bradford, the 'Vice-Chancellor's Excellence in Knowledge Transfer Award'.

In September 2011, Prof Ugail unveiled a new lie detector system that uses two cameras and a computer to try to observe slight changes in facial expressions and facial temperature profile. This new system he developed is a complete step change from the traditional polygraph lie detector, which requires the subject to be wired up to a range of physiological sensors. This system is purely non-invasive and can be used in a covert situation, where the person being monitored potentially knows nothing about it.

In 2011 Professor Ugail received the Maldives National Award for Innovation. He is the first and the only Maldivian to have received this award to date.
 
Prof. Ugail's research work has been funded by a variety of sources. His research finding has been widely published in related international journals and conference proceedings.

In late 2005, the political Maldivian webzine proposed a so-called "Dream Team" to constituent a future government that would bring forth "democracy and prosperity" in the Maldives. Despite Prof. Ugail's training as a mathematician, the compiler of this list placed him as Ambassador to the UK. Though this may be the case, Prof Ugail continues to remain politically neutral and on several occasions, he has openly said that he has no interest in getting politically involved and that he has no interest in running for the office in the Maldives.

Aside from his academic work as a university professor, Professor Ugail continues to inspire people especially Maldivians in the field of science by giving motivational talks, running local television programmes on science and delivering science related information in enthusiastic and engaging ways. For example, he runs a science column, called Professor Ugail's Opinion in the local Maldivian language in Mihaaru - the most prominent and widely distributed newspaper in the Maldives.

Additionally, Professor Ugail undertakes substantial philanthropic work of empowering people by delivering STEM knowledge through the Ugail Foundation, primarily through theCircle by Ugail Foundation, which has imparted coding, critical thinking and leadership skills to many thousands of kids and young people.

Selected works

Books

Patents

References

External links

 Centre for Visual Computing at University of Bradford

Hassan Ugail at Google Scholar
Hassan Ugail at LinkedIn
Hassan Ugail at Twitter
 Tangentix Ltd
 GameSessions

1970 births
Maldivian mathematicians
Maldivian computer scientists
Alumni of King's College London
Alumni of the University of Leeds
Academics of the University of Bradford
Living people